The European Society for Philosophy and Psychology (ESPP) is a professional organization in Europe that promotes discussion and research at the intersection of philosophy, psychology and cognitive science. It is the European counterpart of the American Society for Philosophy and Psychology. The first joint conference of the two societies was held in Barcelona in 2004.

List of presidents

 1999–2001: Josef Perner
 2001–2003: Pierre Jacob
 2006–2008: Alice ter Meulen
 2009–2011: Marc Jeannerod
 2009-2014: Naomi Eilan
 2017–present: Robyn Carston

References

External links
 Official Site

Psychology organisations based in Europe
Philosophical societies
International organizations based in Europe